Scolopia oreophila is a species of plant in the family Salicaceae. It is endemic to South Africa.

References

Flora of South Africa
oreophila
Data deficient plants
Taxonomy articles created by Polbot